Grou is a town in the province Friesland of the Netherlands and had around 5655 citizens in January 2017.  Since 2014 Grou is part of the municipality of Leeuwarden.

Heineken operated a distribution centre for Friesland in Grou for 25 years until 2004.

It used to be the capital of the municipality of  before the reorganization of municipalities in 1984, and capital of the municipality of Boarnsterhim until 2014.

In local lore Sint Piter is a distinct character separate from Saint Nicholas, and was historically known as the patron saint for local fishermen.

A nickname for the town is Tsiisferdûnsers, meaning cheese dancers, from a story where a fiddler was paid with cheese at a village dance.

Transport

The town is located at an exit on the A32 motorway.  There is a ferry across the canal called Veerpont de Burd that connects the de Burd island.  The Grou-Jirnsum railway station is on the Staatslijn A (Arnhem - Leeuwarden) line.

Population

Notable births
  (ca. 1542-1618), clergyman
 Brothers Halbertsma
 Eeltsje Hiddes Halbertsma (1797-1858), physician, poet and writer
 Joast Hiddes Halbertsma (1789-1869), Mennonite minister, writer and poet
 Tsjalling Hiddes Halbertsma (1792–1852), merchant and poet
 Atje Keulen-Deelstra (1938-2013), speed skater
 Haitske Pijlman (born 1954), speed skater

Sport
An artificial ice rink (Glice) invented by Eric Sinnema was opened for public use in 2007.

Gallery

Notable buildings
 St. Peter's church
 Three restored windmills survive in Grou, De Bird, De Borgmolen and De Haensmolen.

References

External links

Global Anabaptist Mennonite Encyclopedia entry for Grouw
de Grouster - local news

Leeuwarden
Populated places in Friesland